Donisthorpe railway station is a disused railway station that formerly served the village of Donisthorpe, North West Leicestershire, from 1874 to 1931. The station was on the Ashby and Nuneaton Joint Railway. The site has since been filled in and is now a footpath to Measham and Moira. The only trace of the former railway is the footpath to Measham.

{
  "type": "FeatureCollection",
  "features": [
    {
      "type": "Feature",
      "properties": {},
      "geometry": {
        "type": "Point",
        "coordinates": [
          -1.5339,
          52.7216
        ]
      }
    }
  ]
}

References

External links
http://www.midlandrailway.org.uk/occasional-papers/donisthorpe/
http://www.shackerstonefestival.co.uk/ANJR/Hdonisthorpe_station.htm
http://podahistory.blogspot.com/2014/07/donisthorpe-railway-station.html

Disused railway stations in Leicestershire
Former Midland Railway stations
Former London and North Western Railway stations
Railway stations in Great Britain opened in 1874
Railway stations in Great Britain closed in 1931